Kurt Baluses (30 June 1914 – 28 March 1972) was a German football player and manager. He was the first manager of VfB Stuttgart in the then newly founded Bundesliga and also had the biggest success of his managing career with the club, leading Stuttgart to a 5th-place finish in 1963–64.

References

External links

1914 births
1972 deaths
Sportspeople from Olsztyn
People from East Prussia
German footballers
German football managers
Association football midfielders
Holstein Kiel players
1. FC Köln managers
Eintracht Braunschweig managers
VfB Stuttgart managers
Kickers Offenbach managers
Karlsruher SC managers
Bundesliga managers